Cromarty was a royal burgh that returned one commissioner to the Parliament of Scotland and to the Convention of Estates.

A royal burgh since 1264, Cromarty had a new charter on 4 July 1593, but this was not enrolled by Parliament until 1661. The right of representation was relinquished in 1672.

List of burgh commissioners
 1661–63: Alexander Clunes 
 1665 convention: Alexander Gibson 
1667 convention: no representation
 1669–70: Thomas Urquhart 
1672: representation relinquished

See also
 Cromartyshire (Parliament of Scotland constituency)

References

 Margaret D. Young, The Parliaments of Scotland: Burgh and Shire Commissioners, volume 2 (1993) Appendix 2, page 771.

Constituencies of the Parliament of Scotland (to 1707)
Politics of the county of Cromarty
History of the Scottish Highlands
Constituencies established in 1661
Constituencies disestablished in 1672
1661 establishments in Scotland
1672 disestablishments in Scotland